The 1928–29 season was Galatasaray SK's 25th in existence and the club's 18th consecutive season in the Istanbul Football League.

Squad statistics

Squad changes for the 1928–29 season

In:

Competitions

Istanbul Football League

Standings

Matches
Kick-off listed in local time (EEST)

Gazi Büstü

Gazi Büstü Tournament was a football tournament between Fenerbahçe SK and Galatasaray SK to promote Tayyare Cemiyeti. The winner of this tournament was awarded with an Atatürk bust which was very important. This statue was the first and last thing that was in the name of Atatürk when he was alive.

Kick-off listed in local time (EEST)

Match officials
Assistant referees:
Unknown
Unknown

Match rules
90 minutes

Match officials
Assistant referees:
Unknown
Unknown

Match rules
90 minutes

Friendly matches

References
 Futbol, Galatasaray. Tercüman Spor Ansiklopedisi vol.2 (1981) page (561)
 1928-1929 İstanbul Futbol Ligi. Türk Futbol Tarihi vol.1. page(47). (June 1992) Türkiye Futbol Federasyonu Yayınları.
 Tuncay, Bülent (2002). Galatasaray Tarihi. Page (119) Yapı Kredi Yayınları 
 Atabeyoğlu, Cem. 1453-1991 Türk Spor Tarihi Ansiklopedisi. page(104, 107, 108, 109).(1991) An Grafik Basın Sanayi ve Ticaret AŞ
 Tekil, Süleyman. Dünden bugüne Galatasaray(1983). Page(176). Arset Matbaacılık Kol.Şti.

External links
 Galatasaray Sports Club Official Website 
 Turkish Football Federation - Galatasaray A.Ş. 
 uefa.com - Galatasaray AŞ

Galatasaray S.K. (football) seasons
Turkish football clubs 1928–29 season
1920s in Istanbul